William Henry Harrison (September 25, 1880 – July 18, 1955) was a Canadian politician. He served in the Legislative Assembly of New Brunswick as member of the Conservative party representing Saint John City from 1925 to 1935, and was Attorney General of New Brunswick from 1933 to 1935.

References

1880 births
1955 deaths
20th-century Canadian politicians
Politicians from Saint John, New Brunswick
Progressive Conservative Party of New Brunswick MLAs